Tombal (also Romanized as Tombel) is a village in Sadat Rural District, in the Central District of Lali County, Khuzestan Province, Iran. At the 2006 census, its population was 185, in 25 families.

References 

Populated places in Lali County